Capital punishment was a legal penalty in the Soviet Union for most of the country's existence. The claimed legal basis for capital punishment was Article 22 of the Fundamental Principles of Criminal Legislation, which stated that the death penalty was permitted "as an exceptional measure of punishment, until its complete abolition".

According to Western estimates, in the early 1980s Soviet courts passed around 2,000 death sentences every year, of which two-thirds were commuted to prison terms. The death penalty was not applied to minors or pregnant women.

History
During the Second All-Russian Congress of Soviets of Workers' and Soldiers' Deputies in November 1917, the government of Soviet Russia decreed the abolition of death penalty. Later in February 1918, death penalty was reinstated. Hangings and shootings very extensively employed by the Bolsheviks as part of their Red Terror.

The first person to be sentenced to death by a Soviet court was Alexey Schastny, Admiral of the Baltic Fleet, on 21 June 1918. Conditional death sentences also occurred in the early 1920s. Decrees issued in 1922, 1923 and 1933 provided police with the right to carry out summary executions, but they were repealed in 1959. Capital punishment was abolished on 26 May 1947, but was reinstated in 1950. Capital punishment was extended to cases of aggravated murder in 1954.

Capital crimes
In addition to crimes such as treason, espionage, terrorism and murder, capital punishment was imposed for economic crimes, such as "the pilfering of state or public property in especially large amounts". The hijacking of a plane became a capital crime in 1973.

Economic crimes
Capital punishment for crimes against state and public property was reintroduced in 1961. During the same year, two foreign currency traders, Rokotov and Faibishenko, were retroactively sentenced to death and executed. By 1987, over 6,000 people had been executed for committing an economic crime. The death penalty was generally applied if the crime involved sums exceeding about 10,000 rubles, though there was no fixed threshold.

Several officials were executed for economic crimes as part of Yuri Andropov's anti-corruption campaign. Vladimir I. Rytov, a deputy Minister of Fisheries, was executed in 1982 for smuggling millions of dollars worth of caviar to the West. The director of Gastronom 1, one of Moscow's most prominent gourmet food stores, was executed in 1984 for corruption. The chairman of Technopromexport was executed in 1984 for "systematically taking big bribes". Bella Borodkina, head of the restaurants and canteens department in Gelendzhik, was sentenced to death for receiving $758,500 in bribes.

In 1964 The New York Times noted that "60 per cent of the 160 persons executed for economic crimes since 1961 were Jews."

Contemporary status

Republics

See also 
 Capital punishment in Russia
 Capital punishment in Belarus
 Capital punishment in Ukraine
 Capital punishment in Cuba
 Capital punishment in Vietnam
 Capital punishment in the United States

References

 
Soviet Union
Crime in the Soviet Union
Soviet law
Human rights abuses in the Soviet Union